The Žukovačka River ( / Žukovačka reka, "Žukovac River") is the largest right tributary of the Trgoviški Timok in Serbia. In its upper course it is also called Leva River (Лева река / Leva reka, "Left River") and Aldinačka River (Алдиначка река / Aldinačka reka). It flows into the Trgoviški Timok near Žukovac.

References

Rivers of Serbia
Timok Valley